Khairul Anuar Baharom (born 26 April 1974 in Kuala Lumpur ) is a Malaysian former footballer. Khairul recently played as a defender and midfielder for Selangor FA.

He was a product of Kuala Lumpur FA youth development team and previously played with Terengganu FA, Perak FA, Negeri Sembilan FA and PDRM FA before joining  Selangor FA. He was released at the end of the 2011 season, and subsequently retired from football. At the start of his career, he played for the Malaysia national football team.

References

External links
 
 Profile at Selangor FA Official Website
 Khairul tekad pertahan benteng

Living people
Malaysian people of Malay descent
Malaysian footballers
Malaysia international footballers
Perak F.C. players
Selangor FA players
Negeri Sembilan FA players
Kedah Darul Aman F.C. players
Terengganu FC players
1974 births
People from Terengganu
Association football defenders
Footballers at the 1994 Asian Games
Asian Games competitors for Malaysia